The 2001 ANZ Tasmanian International was a women's tennis tournament played on outdoor hard courts at the Hobart International Tennis Centre in Hobart, [Australia and was part of Tier V of the 2001 WTA Tour. It was the eighth edition of the tournament and ran from 7 January until 13 January 2001. Unseeded Rita Grande won the singles title and earned $16,000 first-prize money.

Finals

Singles

 Rita Grande defeated  Jennifer Hopkins 0–6, 6–3, 6–3
 It was Grande's 2nd title of the year and the 5th of her career.

Doubles

 Cara Black /  Elena Likhovtseva defeated  Ruxandra Dragomir /  Virginia Ruano Pascual 6–4, 6–1
 It was Black's 1st title of the year and the 2nd of her career. It was Likhovtseva's 1st title of the year and the 10th of her career.

Entrants

Seeds

 Rankings are as of 1 January 2001.

Other entrants
The following players received wildcards into the singles main draw:
  Rachel McQuillan
  Lisa McShea

The following players received entry from the qualifying draw:
  Saori Obata
  Katarina Srebotnik
  Stéphanie Foretz
  Anabel Medina Garrigues

External links
 Official website
 ITF tournament edition details
 Tournament draws

 
Tasmanian International
Tasmanian International
Hobart International